The 1972 College Football All-America team is composed of college football players who were selected as All-Americans by various organizations and writers that chose College Football All-America Teams in 1972. The National Collegiate Athletic Association (NCAA) recognizes six selectors as "official" for the 1972 season. They are: (1) the American Football Coaches Association (AFCA) which selected its team for Kodak based on a vote of the nation's coaches; (2) the Associated Press (AP) selected based on the votes of sports writers at AP newspapers; (3) the Football Writers Association of America (FWAA) selected by the nation's football writers; (4) the Newspaper Enterprise Association (NEA) selected based on the votes of sports writers at NEA newspapers; (5) the United Press International (UPI) selected based on the votes of sports writers at UPI newspapers; and (6) the Walter Camp Football Foundation (WC).

Eight players are recognized by the NCAA as unanimous All-America selections. They are: (1) wide receiver and 1972 Heisman Trophy winner Johnny Rodgers of Nebraska; (2) tight end Charles Young of USC; (3) offensive tackle Jerry Sisemore of Texas; (4) offensive guard John Hannah of Alabama; (5) running back Greg Pruitt of Oklahoma; (6) defensive tackle Greg Marx of Notre Dame; (7) middle guard Rich Glover of Nebraska; and (8) defensive back Brad Van Pelt of Michigan State.

Consensus All-Americans
The following chart identifies the NCAA-recognized consensus All-Americans for the year 1972 and displays which first-team designations they received.

Offense

Receivers 

 Johnny Rodgers, Nebraska 
 Steve Holden, Arizona State 
 Barry Smith, Florida State 
 Jason Caldwell, North Carolina Central 
 Mike Creaney, Notre Dame

Tight ends 

 Charle Young, USC 
 Billy Joe DuPree, Michigan State 
 Al Chandler, Oklahoma 
 Gary Butler, Rice 
 Steve Sweeney, California 
 Daryl White, Nebraska

Tackles 

 Jerry Sisemore, Texas 
 Paul Seymour, Michigan 
 John Hicks, Ohio State 
 Pete Adams, USC 
 John Dampeer, Notre Dame 
 Curtis Wester, East Texas State 
 Bruce Walton, UCLA

Guards 

 John Hannah, Alabama 
 Ron Rusnak, North Carolina 
 Skip Singletary, Temple 
 Joe DeLamielleure, Michigan State 
 Geary Murdock, Iowa State 
 Ken Jones, Oklahoma 
 Larry Ulmer, Western Michigan

Centers 

 Tom Brahaney, Oklahoma 
 Jim Krapf, Alabama 
 Doug Dumler, Nebraska 
 Orderia Mitchell, Air Force 
 Gerald Schultze, West Virginia

Quarterbacks 

 Bert Jones, LSU 
 John Hufnagel, Penn State 
 Gary Huff, Florida State 
 Tony Adams, Utah State 
 Don Strock, Virginia Tech

Running backs 

 Greg Pruitt, Oklahoma 
 Otis Armstrong, Purdue 
 Woody Green, Arizona State 
 Dick Jauron, Yale 
 Sam Cunningham, USC 
 George Amundson, Iowa State 
 Howard Stevens, Louisville 
 Roosevelt Leaks, Texas 
 Charlie Davis, Colorado 
 Anthony Davis, USC 
 Bob Hitchens, Miami (OH) 
 Steve Jones, Duke 
 Pete Van Valkenburg, BYU

Defense

Defensive ends 

 Willie Harper, Nebraska 
 Bruce Bannon, Penn State 
 Wally Chambers, Eastern Kentucky 
 John Matuszak, Tampa 
 Ernie Price, Texas A&I 
 Tab Bennett, Illinois 
 Danny Sanspree, Auburn 
 Steve Bogosian, Army 
 Merv Krakau, Iowa State

Defensive tackles 

 Greg Marx, Notre Dame 
 Dave Butz, Purdue 
 Roger Goree, Baylor 
 John Grant, Southern California 
 Derland Moore, Oklahoma 
 John LeHeup, South Carolina 
 Bud Magram, Colorado  
 George Hasenohrl, Ohio State 
 Bob Leyen, Yale 
 Charlie Davis, Texas Christian

Middle guards 

 Rich Glover, Nebraska 
 Don Rives, Texas Tech 
 Lucious Selmon, Oklahoma 
 Tony Cristiani, Miami (FL)

Linebackers 

 Randy Gradishar, Ohio State 
 John Skorupan, Penn State 
 Steve Brown, Oregon State 
 Jamie Rotella, Tennessee 
 Rich Wood, USC 
 Jim Youngblood, Tennessee Tech 
 Tom Jackson, Louisville 
 Warren Capone, LSU 
 John Mitchell, Alabama 
 Jackie Wallace, Arizona 
 Conrad Graham, Tennessee 
 Matt Blair, Iowa State 
 Glen Gaspard, Texas 
 Jim Merlo, Stanford 
 Eddie Sheats, Kansas

Defensive backs 

 Brad Van Pelt, Michigan State 
 Cullen Bryant, Colorado 
 Randy Logan, Michigan 
 Robert Popelka, Southern Methodist 
 Burgess Owens, Miami  
 Jackie Wallace, Arizona 
 Conrad Graham, Tennessee 
 Randy Rhino, Georgia Tech 
 Calvin Jones, Washington 
 Drane Scrivener, Tulsa 
 Ray Guy, Southern Miss 
 Frank Dowsing, Mississippi State 
 Joe Blahak, Nebraska 
 Jim Thomas, Florida State 
 John Provost, Holy Cross

Special teams

Kickers 

 Ricky Townsend, Tennessee 
 Chris Gartner, Indiana

Punters 

 Ray Guy, Southern Miss

Key 
 Bold – Consensus All-American
 -1 – First-team selection
 -2 – Second-team selection
 -3 – Third-team selection

Official selectors
 AFCA – American Football Coaches Association for Kodak
 AP – Associated Press
 FWAA – Football Writers Association of America
 NEA – Newspaper Enterprise Association
 UPI – United Press International
 WC = Walter Camp Football Foundation

Other selectors
 FN – Football News
 PFW – Pro Football Weekly
 Time – Time magazine
 TSN – The Sporting News

See also
 1972 All-Big Eight Conference football team
 1972 All-Big Ten Conference football team
 1972 All-Pacific-8 Conference football team
 1972 All-SEC football team
 1972 All-Southwest Conference football team

References 

All-America Team
College Football All-America Teams